A Weekend with Lulu is a 1961 British comedy film directed by John Paddy Carstairs and starring Bob Monkhouse, Leslie Phillips, Alfred Marks, Shirley Eaton and Irene Handl.

Plot
Young couple Timothy (Leslie Phillips) and Deirdre (Shirley Eaton) plan a romantic weekend on the coast in a caravan, called "Lulu", owned by the brother of their pal Fred (Bob Monkhouse) and which Fred will tow with his ice cream van, as he will be working selling ice cream over the weekend. When Deirdre's mother (Irene Handl) insists on going along as her daughter's chaperone, Timothy's plans are somewhat compromised. Then a train ferry mix-up lands the holidaymakers deep in France without passports or money. As they try to get back to England, they encounter a variety of  problems, and end up being pursued across country by the French police.

They end at the Chateau de Chant Claire where the Comte (Alfred Marks) shows his wine cellars.

They discover they can fly out from Trouville for £25 but need to raise the cash. Fred takes bets in a local bar (run by Sid James) on the local leg of the Tour de France). Fred steals the stake money and they run off pursued by locals.

However a French motorcycle cop mistakes the ice cream van and escorts them to the airport and they escape.

Cast
Bob Monkhouse as Fred Scrutton
Leslie Phillips as Timothy Gray
Alfred Marks as Comte de Grenoble
Shirley Eaton as Deirdre Proudfoot
Irene Handl as Florence Bell
Sid James as Café Patron
Kenneth Connor as British Tourist
Sydney Tafler as Stationmaster
Eugene Deckers as Inspector Larue
Graham Stark as French policeman, Chiron
Tutte Lemkow as Postman Léon
Judith Furse as Madame Bon-Bon the brothel owner
Denis Shaw as Bar Patron
Russ Conway as French pianist

Critical reception
Britmovie called the film a "Breezy farce spiced with Gallic wisecracks...Bob Monkhouse, Leslie Phillips and Alfred Marks play off each other energetically, whilst Irene Handl is wonderful as the interfering busybody." TV Guide gave it two out of four stars, calling it "An enjoyable comedy."

References

External links

1961 films
1961 comedy films
British comedy films
Films directed by John Paddy Carstairs
Films set in France
British black-and-white films
Hammer Film Productions films
1960s English-language films
1960s British films